The Hainan Island monsoon rain forests ecoregion (WWF ID:IM0169) covers mountainous interior of Hainan Island in China.  The tropical forests receive over 1,000 mm/year of rain, heavily concentrated in the summer rainy season.  The island has high levels of biodiversity, with over 4,200 plant species, 630 of which are endemic to the island.  The region is under ecological pressure from deforestation for agriculture and timber extraction.

Location and description 
Hainan ("South of the Sea") Island is about 13,000 square miles in area, and separated from the Leizhou Peninsula by only 15 miles. The monsoon rain forest ecoregion encompasses the interior mountain range, surrounded by the coastal plains. (The coastal plains fall in an entirely different ecoregion - the South China-Vietnam subtropical evergreen forests ecoregion). There is a small sector of this ecoregion on the east coast of the Leizhou Peninsula.

Climate 
The climate of the ecoregion is Tropical savanna climate - dry winter (Köppen climate classification (Aw)).  This climate is characterized by relatively even temperatures throughout the year, and a pronounced dry season.  The driest month has less than 60 mm of precipitation, and is drier than the average month.  Precipitation averages up 2,000 mm/yr on the west side; 1,000 mm/year on the east side.

Flora and fauna 
Because Hainan Island and the Leizhou Peninsula were connected by a land bridge until the Quaternary, there are relatively few endemic genera, but many endemic species.  Scientists have recorded 4,200 plant species (including 450 trees), and 98 mammal species.  During the dry season before monsoon season in the summer, drought-stressed deciduous trees drop their leaves. The forest canopy is generally sparse, and sufficient light reaches the ground to support a grass under-story.  Trees at the mid-level altitudes include chinquapin (Castanopsis, stone oaks (Lithocarpus), and laurels (Lauraceae). At higher and drier areas of the interior, more savanna-like conditions are found, with brush and silk trees (Albizia procera).  Above 1,600 meters, a cloud forest exists.

See also 
 List of ecoregions in China

References 

Ecoregions of China
Indomalayan ecoregions
Tropical and subtropical moist broadleaf forests